Kosmos 132 ( meaning Cosmos 132) or Zenit-2 No.46 was a Soviet, first generation, low resolution, optical film-return reconnaissance satellite launched in 1966.

Kosmos 132 was launched by a Vostok-2 rocket, serial number N15001-08, flying from Site 31/6 at the Baikonur Cosmodrome. The launch took place at 08:09 GMT on 19 November 1966, and following its successful arrival in orbit the spacecraft received its Kosmos designation, along with the International Designator 1966-106A and the Satellite Catalog Number 02599.

After spending eight days in orbit, Kosmos 132 was deorbited with its return capsule descending under parachute, landing at 07:12 GMT on 27 November 1966, and recovered by Soviet force.

References

Kosmos satellites
Spacecraft launched in 1966
Spacecraft which reentered in 1966
Zenit-2 satellites
1966 in the Soviet Union